Kikihia longula, commonly known as the Chatham Island cicada, is a species of cicada that is endemic to New Zealand. This species was first described by George Hudson in 1950.

References

Cicadas of New Zealand
Insects described in 1950
Endemic fauna of New Zealand
Taxa named by George Hudson
Cicadettini
Endemic insects of New Zealand